Haswell may refer to:

Places
 Haswell, County Durham, England
 Haswell, Colorado, US
 Haswell Islands, an Antarctic island chain
 Haswell Island, the largest of the Haswell Islands

Other uses
 Haswell (surname)
 Haswell (microarchitecture), the Intel codename for a processor (CPU) microarchitecture
 23809 Haswell, an asteroid

See also
 High Haswell, a village
 Haswell Moor
 Haswell Plough, a village
 Haswell Grange, a former monastery
 Haswell's frog
 Isaac M. Haswell House, in Albany County, New York, US
 Haswell New Instructions, an expansion of the AVX instruction set for the Haswell processor